Mahendra Dhoj G.C. is a Nepalese politician, belonging to the Nepali Congress. In the 2008 Constituent Assembly election he was elected from the Nawalparasi-2 constituency, winning 12166 votes. He has been engaged in politics since his early 20s, and has been continuously engaged ever since. In the last Constitutional Assembly he was the Parliamentary Secretary of the Nepali Congress Party. He has engaged his entire life in social service, spearheading many development projects in the villages, and is the most popular leader of Nepali Congress Party in Nawalparasi District.

References

Living people
Nepali Congress politicians from Gandaki Province
Year of birth missing (living people)

Members of the 1st Nepalese Constituent Assembly
Nepal MPs 1994–1999